Reimo Tamm (born 29 December 1984 in Viljandi, Estonia) is an Estonian professional basketball player. He is currently playing for Estonian club BC Tallinna Kalev at the point guard position. He has been a member of Estonia national basketball team.

Honours
Korvpalli Meistriliiga: 2005, 2006, 2011, 2012
Estonian Basketball Cup: 2005, 2006, 2012
BBL Cup: 2012

External links
 Profile at bbl.net

References

1984 births
Living people
BC Kalev/Cramo players
BC Tallinn Kalev players
BC Rakvere Tarvas players
Estonian men's basketball players
Korvpalli Meistriliiga players
Rapla KK players
Sportspeople from Viljandi
TTÜ KK players
Point guards